State Route 66 (SR 66) is a north–south state highway in the northwestern portion of the U.S. state of Ohio.  Its southern terminus is at U.S. Route 36 (US 36) in Piqua, and its northern terminus is at US 20 in Fayette.  South of Defiance it generally follows the route of the former Miami and Erie Canal.

Route description
The portion of SR 66 between Washington Avenue in Piqua and the Miami/Shelby County line is designated as the "Cpl. Samuel F. Pearson Memorial Highway", in honor of a Piqua High School graduate who was killed at Camp Victory in Baghdad, Iraq, while serving in the Army Reserve, on October 10, 2007.

History

1924 – Original route established.
1931 – Truncated at Fayette; U.S. Route 127 replaced the route’s alignment from Fayette to the Michigan state line.

Major junctions

SR 66 Truck

SR 66 Truck is a truck route which bypasses a low railroad bridge along SR 66 in southern Defiance. Beginning at a signalized intersection with South Jefferson Avenue (SR 66), it heads west on Downs Street through a residential neighborhood. At South Clinton Street, SR 111, SR 111 Truck becomes concurrent with SR 66 Truck and both head northwest along Deatrick Street passing a supermarket and three sets of railroad tracks at-grade. At Baltimore Street (former SR 424), the two truck routes turn northeast onto Holgate Avenue paralleling the Maumee River. After heading through a residential neighborhood of the city, the road bends to the east and transitions to West Third Street. After passing under a railroad bridge, it passes numerous businesses and city facilities before reaching SR 111 again at the intersection of Third Street and Clinton Street. While SR 111 Truck ends, SR 66 Truck continues on South Clinton Street with SR 111 for one block before ending at SR 15/SR 18/SR 66.

References

External links

066
Transportation in Miami County, Ohio
Transportation in Shelby County, Ohio
Transportation in Auglaize County, Ohio
Transportation in Allen County, Ohio
Transportation in Van Wert County, Ohio
Transportation in Putnam County, Ohio
Transportation in Paulding County, Ohio
Transportation in Defiance County, Ohio
Transportation in Williams County, Ohio
Transportation in Henry County, Ohio
Transportation in Fulton County, Ohio